Catherine Carey, after her marriage Catherine Knollys and later known as both Lady Knollys  and Dame Catherine Knollys, (c. 1522 – 15 January 1569), was chief Lady of the Bedchamber to Queen Elizabeth I, who was her first cousin.

Biography
Catherine Carey was born in 1522, the daughter of William Carey of Aldenham in Hertfordshire, Gentleman of the Privy Chamber and Esquire of the Body to Henry VIII, and his wife Mary Boleyn, who had once been a mistress of the king. Catherine was thus Elizabeth I's maternal first cousin. Some historians believe that Catherine was an illegitimate child of Henry VIII, which would make her also Elizabeth I's paternal half-sister through their shared father, Henry VIII.

Catherine was said to be a witness to the execution of her aunt, Anne Boleyn, in 1536; however, claims that she had stayed overnight to entertain and distract her aunt Anne in the Tower of London before the latter's execution have been dismissed.

Catherine went on to become Maid of Honour to both Anne of Cleves and Catherine Howard, the fourth and fifth wives of Henry VIII. On 26 April 1540 she married Sir Francis Knollys. Her husband was named a Knight of the Garter in 1593, although he had already been knighted in 1547. He was also Treasurer of the Royal Household. From the time of her marriage, Catherine became known as Mistress Knollys, and from 1547 as Lady Knollys. When not in London, the couple lived at Reading in Berkshire and Rotherfield Greys in Oxfordshire, and because they were staunch Protestants, they fled to Germany during the reign of Queen Mary I.

Princess Elizabeth wrote to her cousin there, and Catherine was appointed Chief Lady of the Bedchamber after Elizabeth became queen. For the first ten years of the reign, Lady Catherine combined the most senior post among the ladies-in-waiting with motherhood to more than a dozen children. Elizabeth never recognized Catherine as her half-sister, and it was certainly not a relationship that Catherine or Sir Francis ever openly claimed. At court, Catherine was acknowledged as the queen's favourite among her first cousins, and Elizabeth's lack of other female relatives to whom she felt close may be adequate to explain this favoured position.

She died on 15 January 1569 at Hampton Court Palace, being outlived by her husband and children, and was buried the following April in St Edmund's Chapel in Westminster Abbey. There is a small commemorative plaque in the abbey, although her chief monument is at Rotherfield Greys in Oxfordshire.

Catherine's epitaph reads:

Issue
Sir Francis and Lady Knollys produced a number of offspring who survived to maturity. Of the children listed, only the last, Dudley, is known to have died in infancy:

Mary Knollys (c. 1541 – 1593). She married Edward Stalker.
Sir Henry Knollys (c. 1542 – 1582). He was a member of parliament representing first Shoreham, Kent (1563) and then Oxfordshire. Esquire of the Body to Elizabeth I. He was married to Margaret Cave (1549–1600), daughter of Sir Ambrose Cave and Margaret Willington. Their daughter Lettice Knollys (1583–1655) married before 19 June 1602 William Paget, 4th Baron Paget.
Lettice Knollys, Countess of Essex and of Leicester (8 November 1543 – 25 December 1634). She married first Walter Devereux, 1st Earl of Essex, secondly Robert Dudley, 1st Earl of Leicester, and thirdly Sir Christopher Blount.
William Knollys, 1st Earl of Banbury, (c. 1544 – 25 May 1632). He was married first to Dorothy Bray, who was 20 years his senior; and secondly to Elizabeth Howard, daughter of Thomas Howard, 1st Earl of Suffolk, and his second wife Catherine Knyvett.
Edward Knollys (1546–1580). He was a member of Parliament.
Sir Robert Knollys (1547–1626). Member of Parliament representing Reading, Berkshire (1572–1589), Brecknockshire (1589–1604), Abingdon, Oxfordshire (1604, 1624–1625) and finally Berkshire (1626). He married Catherine Vaughan, daughter of Sir Rowland Vaughan, of Porthamel.
Richard Knollys (1548 – 21 August 1596). Member of Parliament representing first Wallingford (1584) and then Northampton (1588). Married Joan Heigham, daughter of John Heigham, of Gifford's Hall, Wickhambrook, Suffolk.
Elizabeth Knollys (15 June 1549 – c. 1605). Lady Elizabeth married Sir Thomas Leighton of Feckenham, Worcester, son of John Leighton of Watlesburgh and Joyce Sutton, in 1578. Her husband served as Governor of Jersey and Guernsey.
Maud Knollys (1548 – ?). Died young.
Sir Thomas Knollys (died 1596). Known for service in the Eighty Years' War (1568–1648). Governor of Ostend in 1586. Married Odelia de Morana, daughter of John de Morada, Marquess of Bergen.
Sir Francis Knollys "the Younger" (c. 1552 – 1648). Member of Parliament representing first Oxford (1572–1588) and then Berkshire (1597, 1625). Married Lettice Barrett, daughter of John Barrett, of Hanham. Father-in-law of John Hampden.
Anne Knollys (19 July 1555 – 30 August 1608). Married Thomas West, 2nd Baron De La Warr. Mother to Thomas West, 3rd Baron De La Warr, after whom the state of Delaware is named.
Catherine Knollys (21 October 1559 – 20 December 1620). Married first Gerald FitzGerald, Baron Offaly (son of Gerald FitzGerald, 11th Earl of Kildare and Mabel Browne) and secondly Sir Phillip Butler, of Watton Woodhall. She was the mother of Lettice Digby, 1st Baroness Offaly.
Cecily Knollys (c. 1560 - ?).No known descendants.
Margaret Knollys. No known descendants.
Dudley Knollys (9 May 1562 – June 1562)

In literature
The possibility that Catherine, and perhaps her brother Henry, were illegitimate children of Henry VIII, appears in many works of fiction, including Wendy J. Dunn's The Light in the Labyrinth and Philippa Gregory's The Other Boleyn Girl. Carey is also a character in Gregory's The Boleyn Inheritance, where she is sent to the royal court during the time of Queens Anne of Cleves and Catherine Howard, and in The Virgin's Lover, where, as the mother of the seventeen-year-old Lettice Knollys, she is among Elizabeth I's closest companions. In Henry VIII's Wives by Alison Prince, the book's narrator has a friend, Catherine "Kitty" Carey, whose father died of sweating sickness and whose mother is Mary Boleyn. In this book, Catherine was thought to be the king's daughter.
Catherine is the featured subject in the novel Cor Rotto: A Novel of Catherine Carey by Adrienne Dillard and the young adult novel The Light in the Labyrinth by Wendy J. Dunn.

Notes

References

External links

English courtiers
People of the Elizabethan era
1520s births
1569 deaths
Burials at Westminster Abbey
Ladies of the Bedchamber
People from Rotherfield Greys
People from Reading, Berkshire
Mary Boleyn
Catherine
Knollys family
Illegitimate children of Henry VIII of England
16th-century English women
Court of Elizabeth I
Household of Anne of Cleves
Household of Catherine Howard
Wives of knights